Yuwen Mohuai (pinyin: Yǔwén Mòhuaí) (?–293) was a chieftain of the Yuwen tribe from 260 to 293 CE.

According to Wei Shu vol. 103, Biography of Yuwen Mohuai of Xiongnu:Yuwen Mohuai of the Xiongnu was from Liaodong, the region beyond the northern border of China Proper. His ancestor was a remote relative of the southern Shanyu. (The Yuwen) had been the chief of the eastern section (of the Xianbei) for many generations. The (Yuwen)'s language differed widely from the Xianbei's. (The Yuwen) people all had shaved hair, but the hair on top of the head was left as a decoration. When the hair was over some cun long, it would be cut short. The women had long robes, which draped from their shoulders to their feet, but (they) did not wear skirts. When autumn came, they collected Wutou as poison, and used it to shoot birds and beasts.

References

Chieftains of the Yuwen clan
293 deaths